The 1996 United States presidential election in Arizona took place on November 5, 1996, as part of the 1996 United States presidential election. Voters chose eight representatives, or electors to the Electoral College, who voted for president and vice president. Arizona was won by President Bill Clinton (D) over Senator Bob Dole (R-KS), with Clinton winning 46.5% to 44.3% by a margin of 2.2%.

Clinton had come fairly close to winning Arizona four years earlier. In his re-election bid, he was able to gain a larger share of the vote in Democratic-trending Pima County as well as most of northern Arizona. He also increased his support in Maricopa County, although it was again carried by the Republican candidate. His statewide margin of victory was slightly over 31,000 votes out of about 1.4 million cast. Billionaire businessman Ross Perot (Reform-TX) finished in third, with 8.0% of the popular vote. Exit polls suggest he did not change the outcome. As of 2020, this is the last election in which the following counties have voted for a Democratic presidential candidate: Gila, Greenlee, Navajo, Pinal and La Paz.

This is the only presidential election in Arizona's history in which Maricopa County, containing more than half of Arizona's population, voted for a candidate that lost the state, and one of only two elections in which Yavapai County, home to the city of Prescott, did so. This was the first time a Democrat had won Arizona in a presidential election since 1948, and the last time until 2020. Had Dole won the state, Arizona would have had the longest streak of consecutive Republican wins in the nation until 2020.

Results

Results by county

References

Arizona
1996
1996 Arizona elections